Eleocharis brassii is a sedge of the family Cyperaceae that is native to Australia.

It blooms between April and June producing white flowers.

It is found in and around pools and swampy areas in the Kimberley region of Western Australia and the top end of the Northern Territory where it grows in sandy soils.

References

Plants described in 1938
Flora of Western Australia
brassii